Mr. Moustache may refer to:
Bleach (Nirvana album), the debut studio album by American rock band Nirvana, released on June 15, 1989, by Sub Pop. The main recording sessions took place at Reciprocal Recording in Seattle, Washington between December 1988 and January 1989.
Bo Nat Khann Mway (1961–2016), also known by his aliases as "General Saw Lah Pwe", "Na Kham Mwe", "Na Kam Mui" and "Bo Moustache".